Origin recognition complex subunit 2 is a protein that is encoded by the ORC2 (ORC2L) gene in humans.

Function 

The origin recognition complex (ORC) is a highly conserved six subunits protein complex essential for the initiation of the DNA replication in eukaryotic cells. Studies in yeast demonstrated that ORC binds specifically to origins of replication and serves as a platform for the assembly of additional initiation factors such as Cdc6 and Mcm proteins. The protein encoded by this gene is a subunit of the ORC complex. This protein forms a core complex with ORC3, ORC4, and ORC5. It also interacts with CDC45L and MCM10, which are proteins known to be important for the initiation of DNA replication. This protein has been demonstrated to specifically associate with the origin of replication of Epstein-Barr virus in human cells, and is thought to be required for DNA replication from viral origin of replication.

Interactions 

ORC2 has been shown to interact with:

 CDC6, 
 DBF4, 
 MCM10, 
 MCM2 
 MCM4, 
 MCM5, 
 MCM6, 
 MCM7, 
 ORC1, 
 ORC3, 
 ORC4, 
 ORC5, 
 ORC6, and
 Replication protein A1.

References

Further reading

External links 
 PDBe-KB provides an overview of all the structure information available in the PDB for Human Origin recognition complex subunit 2 (ORC2)